Kelly Coffield Park (born January 19, 1962) is an American actress and comedian. She is best known for being an original cast member of the sketch comedy television series In Living Color.

In 1997, Park had a supporting role in the short-lived Fox ensemble drama 413 Hope St.  She has also appeared in feature films such as Field of Dreams (1989), Quiz Show (1994), Jerry Maguire (1996), Rhinos (1999), Scary Movie (2000), The Specials (2000), and Undercover Brother (2002; cameo appearance).  Her latest film is Bride Wars (2009).

Park appeared on an episode of the TV series Wings and on the Seinfeld episodes "The Chinese Woman" and "The Pledge Drive" as "Noreen," whose relationships with men were regularly destroyed by Elaine Benes. Kelly has also made guest appearances on My Wife and Kids and The Jamie Foxx Show.

She married Steve Park, another former cast member of In Living Color, in 1999. They have a son, Owen, and a daughter, Eliza.

Filmography

References

External links

American women comedians
American film actresses
American television actresses
American voice actresses
Place of birth missing (living people)
Living people
1962 births
20th-century American comedians
20th-century American actresses
21st-century American comedians
21st-century American actresses